Eduardo Ignacio Farías Díaz (born 1 January 1989) is a Chilean footballer that currently plays for Primera B de Chile club Cobreloa as a midfielder.

External links
 
 
 Eduardo Farías at Football-Lineups

1989 births
Living people
Chilean footballers
Cobresal footballers
Unión La Calera footballers
Deportes Magallanes footballers
Magallanes footballers
Deportes Iquique footballers
Cobreloa footballers
Chilean Primera División players
Primera B de Chile players
Expatriate footballers in Chile
Association football midfielders